The Cocaine Bear, also known as Pablo Eskobear (sometimes spelled Escobear) or Cokey the Bear, was a 175-pound (79-kilogram) American black bear that fatally overdosed on cocaine in 1985. The cocaine had been dropped by drug smugglers in the wilderness in Tennessee, United States. The bear was found dead in northern Georgia and was stuffed and displayed at a mall in Kentucky. It inspired the 2023 comedy thriller film Cocaine Bear.

History 
On September 11, 1985, former Lexington police department narcotics officer turned drug smuggler Andrew C. Thornton II was trafficking cocaine from Colombia into the United States. After dropping off a shipment in Blairsville, Georgia, Thornton and an accomplice departed in a self-piloted Cessna 404 Titan. En route, the duo dropped a load of 40 plastic containers of cocaine into the wilderness before abandoning the plane above Knoxville, Tennessee. Thornton was killed instantly when his parachute failed to open. According to the FBI, Thornton dumped his cargo because the load of two men, in addition to the cocaine, was too heavy for the plane to carry. 

On December 23, the Georgia Bureau of Investigation reported finding a dead black bear that had eaten a large amount of the cocaine from the jettisoned containers. The containers had held about 75 pounds (34 kilograms) of cocaine, valued at $20 million ($55.6 million adjusted for inflation), and by the time the scene was studied by government authorities, all of the containers had been ripped open, with their contents scattered. The chief medical examiner from the Georgia State Crime Lab, Dr. Kenneth Alonso, stated that its stomach was "literally packed to the brim with cocaine", although he estimated the bear had absorbed only 3 to 4 grams into its bloodstream at the time of its death.

Dr. Alonso did not want to waste the body of the bear, so he had it taxidermied and gave it to the Chattahoochee River National Recreation Area. The bear, however, disappeared until it emerged again in a pawn shop. Eventually it made its way to the "Kentucky for Kentucky Fun Mall" in Lexington, Kentucky where it remains to this day. It has been alleged that the bear kept in Lexington is not the same bear that died in Georgia, but rather another, unrelated bear, due to the fact that the original bear was in a state of decomposition, although the mall maintains that the bear is the original.

According to the bear's owners, the Cocaine Bear has the authority to officiate legally binding weddings in the mall where it is kept due to Kentucky's marriage laws. This claim is only partly true; the bear does not have the authority to solemnize weddings, but the state of Kentucky cannot invalidate marriages performed by unqualified persons if the parties believe that the person marrying them has the authority to do so. As such, it is a belief in the Cocaine Bear's authority that allows it to officiate legally binding weddings in Kentucky.

Film adaptation
On March 9, 2021, Universal Pictures announced that a film, Cocaine Bear, would be directed by Elizabeth Banks. The film takes significant liberties—while the events which occurred between the bear's ingestion of cocaine and its death are not known, the bear is not known to have caused any deaths, unlike the film portrayed. The film was released on February 24, 2023.

See also 
 List of individual bears

References 

1985 animal deaths
Cocaine-related deaths in Georgia (U.S. state)
Individual bears
Individual taxidermy exhibits